The United States Navy has approximately  ships in both active service and the reserve fleet, with approximately  more in either the planning and ordering stages or under construction, according to the Naval Vessel Register and published reports. This list includes ships that are owned and leased by the US Navy; ships that are formally commissioned, by way of ceremony, and non-commissioned. Ships denoted with the prefix "USS" are commissioned ships. Prior to commissioning, ships may be described as a "pre-commissioning unit" or PCU, but are officially referred to by name with no prefix. US Navy support ships are often non-commissioned ships organized and operated by Military Sealift Command. Among these support ships, those denoted "USNS" are owned by the US Navy. Those denoted by "MV" or "SS" are chartered.

Current ships include commissioned warships that are in active service, as well as ships that are part of Military Sealift Command, the support component and the Ready Reserve Force, that while non-commissioned, are still part of the effective force of the US Navy. Future ships listed are those that are in the planning stages, or are currently under construction, from having the keel laid to fitting out and final sea trials.

There exist a number of former US Navy ships which are museum ships (not listed here), some of which may be US government-owned. One of these, a three-masted tall ship, is one of the original six frigates of the United States Navy. It is the oldest naval vessel afloat, and still retains its commission (and hence is listed here), as a special commemoration for that ship alone.

Current ships

Commissioned

Note

Non-commissioned

Support

Ready Reserve Force ships
Ready Reserve Force ships are maintained by the United States Maritime Administration and are part of the United States Navy ship inventory. If activated, these ships would be operated by Military Sealift Command.

Reserve fleet

Future ships

Under construction

Note: Ships listed here may be referred to as "pre-commissioning unit" or "PCU" in various sources including US Navy webpages. While 'PCU' might be used informally as a prefix in some sources, it is not an official ship prefix. Ships listed here may be delivered to United States Navy but are not actively commissioned

On order

The following ships have been ordered but have not yet had their keel laid down, and therefore have not reached 'under construction' status.

Fleet totals

Images
Commissioned

Non-commissioned

Support

Ready Reserve Force ships

Reserve fleet

Under construction

On order

See also

 List of currently active United States military watercraft
 List of equipment of the United States Navy – Watercraft
 List of equipment of the United States Armed Forces – Watercraft
 United States Navy ships
 United States Merchant Marine
 List of United States Navy ships (includes current and former USN ships)
 Strategic Sealift Ships
 Ship identifier
 United States ship naming conventions
 List of museum ships of the United States military
 List of ships of the United States Army
 List of ships of the United States Air Force
 List of United States Coast Guard cutters (includes current and former USCG Cutters)

References

External links
 "The United States Navy, including the Military Sealift Command's Combat Logistic Ships as well as Special Mission Ships, as of April 2015", detailed graphic, introduced by this April 29, 2015 Business Insider story: "This chart shows just how massive the US Navy is", by Jeremy Bender
 Naval Vessel Register
 Military Sealift Command Inventory
 Ship Alpha Roster
 Ship Homeports

Ships of the United States Navy
Lists of ships of the United States